Infanta Maria Cristina of Spain and Portugal (5 June 1833 – 19 January 1902) was a daughter of Infante Francisco de Paula of Spain and his wife Princess Luisa Carlotta of the Two Sicilies. She became an Infanta of Portugal by her marriage to Infante Sebastian of Portugal and Spain.

Family
Maria Cristina was one of eleven children born to Infante Francisco de Paula of Spain and Princess Luisa Carlotta of the Two Sicilies in Madrid. Her father was in turn a younger son of Charles IV of Spain. Her mother was a daughter of Francis I of the Two Sicilies.

Maria Cristina was a sister of Francisco de Asís, the king-consort of Isabella II of Spain, and of Amalia, Princess Adalbert of Bavaria.

Marriage and children

On 19 November 1860, Maria Cristina became the second wife of the much older Infante Sebastian of Portugal and Spain, who was a paternal great grandson of Charles III of Spain and a maternal grandson of John VI of Portugal. Sebastian and his immediate family had been in conflict with the Queen Regent Maria Christina, losing all of his titles and claims to the Spanish throne in 1837. He was restored to his Spanish titles upon his second marriage to Maria Cristina, who was both a cousin and a sister-in-law of Queen Isabella II.

The nuptials took place in the Royal Palace of Madrid. In the spirit of reconciliation, the celebration was attended by Isabella II of Spain and her husband, among other members of the Spanish royal family. They had five children:

Later life
After the overthrow of the monarchy in 1868, Maria Cristina and her family had to leave Spain and take refuge in France. Sebastian died there in 1875. Maria Cristina later returned to Spain, and was able to live calmly until her 1902 death in Madrid. She is buried at the San Lorenzo de El Escorial.

Heraldry

Ancestry

References

House of Bourbon (Spain)
Spanish infantas
Portuguese infantas
1833 births
1902 deaths
Nobility from Madrid
House of Bourbon-Braganza
Burials in the Pantheon of Infantes at El Escorial